Lapslie is a surname. Notable people with the surname include:

George Lapslie (born 1997), English footballer
James Lapslie (1750–1824), Scottish minister and historian
Tom Lapslie (born 1995), English footballer

See also
Lapsley